Jung Il-hoon (born October 4, 1994), simply known as Ilhoon, is a South Korean rapper, songwriter, record producer, host, actor and entertainer.  He was the  rapper of the South Korean boy band BtoB. He is well known for his collaborations with artists such as Hyuna and G.NA, as well for being an assistant MC on the variety show Weekly Idol. Ilhoon made his acting debut starring in the drama Webtoon Hero: Tundra Show in 2015. He was also known for popularising the gestures for "Gwiyomi Player", later confirmed he was taught it by Yujin when she was a trainee.

Biography

Jung Il-hoon was born on October 4, 1994, in Seoul, South Korea. He graduated from Hanlim Multi Art School and attended Korea College of Media Arts with acting course. He is the younger brother of singer Joo.

Career

Pre-debut 
Jung had filled in for labelmate Yong Jun-hyung during some of G.NA's debut promotions with "I'll Back Off So You Can Live Better" on music shows, in 2010. In 2011, Jung (along with four other members of BtoB's initial lineup) made his acting debut in the JTBC sitcom, I Live in Cheongdam Dong.

BtoB

Jung debuted as the rapper of the boy group BtoB in 2012. The group made their official debut on Mnet's M! Countdown on March 21. After being active as main rapper and also produce songs for BTOB, he left the group on December 31, 2020, after being investigated by the Seoul Metropolitan Police Agency for using marijuana in prior years.

Solo activities 
Since 2012, Jung has been continuously appearing on variety show Weekly Idol as a special MC together with Apink's Bomi. Jung had his last broadcast on Weekly Idol on its 206th episode. In 2012, he collaborated with 4Minute's Gayoon with the song "My Love By My Side" for the musical of the same name. He also featured in Hyuna's "Unripe Apple" which was a track from her second EP, Melting.

In 2013, he was featured in 2YOON's Harvest Moon EP for the track "Nightmare", where he showed his impressive rapping skills. His featuring activities continued as he was later on revealed to be collaborating with G.NA for the lead single, "Oops!", of the Beautiful Kisses EP.

In 2015, Jung starred in the web-drama, Webtoon Hero: Tundra Show as Kim Sung-min. Later that year, Cube Entertainment announced Hyuna's lead single for A+, titled "Roll Deep" (Because I'm the Best), would feature Jung. He also participated in the making of the album. He was only able to perform with Hyuna twice as there was a conflict with other BtoB schedules, and was replaced by Cube Entertainment's trainee, Kim Hyo-jong. Later in 2015, Jung joined the line-up for Unpretty Rapstar 2's semi-finals episode as he performed with contestant Jiyoon for the track "This Ain't Me".

On May 24, 2017, it was revealed that Jung would be releasing a self-composed track on May 30, as part of BtoB's "Piece of BtoB" solo project. On May 26, it was revealed the song would be "Fancy Shoes", a song that he had had previously performed at BtoB's solo concert, BtoB Time 2017.

In September 2017, it was announced Jung would be joining the cast of web-mockumentary (fashioned as a cosmetics reality program), The Cushion, alongside label mate Yoo Seon-ho and Korean beauty YouTuber Lena. All the episodes were uploaded on Naver TV, YouTube and Oksusu from October to November 2017.

On February 12, 2018, it was announced that Jung would be releasing his first solo album in March. The album, titled Big Wave, was released on March 8, containing five tracks which feature fellow BtoB member Hyunsik with the song "Come Closer" and Jinho of Pentagon with the song "Always". The lead single, titled "She's Gone", is a hip hop song which describes complicated break up feelings. Jung had previously performed the song at BTOB's 2017 BTOB Time - Our Concert, from 23 to 24 December at the Ilsan Kintex Exhibition Center. He participated in writing and composing the songs. In October, he was featured on the song "Cookies" from F.T. Island's Lee Hong-gi's EP Do n Do.

On February 21, 2019, Jung dropped a digital single, "Spoiler", featuring solo artist Babylon.

Personal life 
He was the DJ for Idol Radio for Episodes 7-363 (absent in episodes 31, 198, 308) from September 2018 until September 2019.

Jung enlisted on May 28, 2020 and was serving as a public service worker.

Legal issues

On December 21, 2020, it was reported that Jung was under investigation by the Seoul Metropolitan Police Agency along with accomplices for purchasing and using cannabis in prior years and that his case had already been handed to prosecution earlier in July. Cube Entertainment announced Jung's departure from BtoB on December 31, 2020.

Jung submitted 2 statements of self-reflection to the court on April 15, 2021 and attended the first hearing on the morning of April 22, 2021. According to the prosecutor's statement, from July 5, 2016 to January 9, 2019, Jung with conspirators remitted 133 million KRW over 161 times, using cryptocurrency, and bought and inhaled 826 g and 20 ml of cannabis. After that, Jung did cannabis without conspirators. Jung admitted all charges.

At the decision hearing on the afternoon of May 20, 2021, the prosecutors sought a 4-year prison sentence and a 133.065 million KRW fine. Jung submitted a letter of reflection to the court on June 8, 2021 and the trial court sentenced Jung to 2 years in prison and a fine of 133 million KRW on the afternoon of June 10, 2021. Jung, who was tried without detention, was arrested in court the same day.

Jung filed an appeal on June 14, 2021 on the basis of misunderstandings of the fact and the law during the initial trial. The prosecution did not file a cross-appeal. The first hearing of the appeal trial was held on the afternoon of September 2, 2021 while the second hearing was on the morning of October 7, 2021. The content of the indictment was partially changed due to the difference in the number of actual purchases and smoking times and the legal misunderstanding about the fine. A huge amount of petitions from fans were also submitted.

The decision hearing that was scheduled to be held on the afternoon of November 4, 2021 was postponed to the afternoon of November 18, 2021 due to the aftermath of the spread of COVID-19. The prosecutors sought a 2-year prison sentence and a lower 126.63 million KRW fine. At the sentencing hearing held on the afternoon of December 16, 2021, the appeal court overturned the judgment of the trial court suspending Jung's 2 years prison sentence with 3 years probation. Jung was also ordered a 40-hour drug treatment and a 126.63 million KRW fine.

According to the court, Jung did not systematically smoke marijuana, and Jung's purchase using cryptocurrency did not appear to be deliberate. Jung seemed to have voluntarily stopped around January 2019 and had since made efforts to prevent recidivism. Jung received psychiatric treatment to quit drugs, took online lectures for addiction treatment, and maintained a strong bond with his family as well as other social ties to keep him straight. Since the start of the appeal trial, Jung submitted 105 statements of self-reflection, and his fans also submitted petitions.

On December 24, 2021 Jung personally apologized for his case through a handwritten letter. The letter was later archived from his Instagram on September 29, 2022.Hello, this is Jung Ilhoon.

Over the past few years, during my investigation and trial period, as well as the time I was imprisoned, I was able to look back on my life while reflecting painfully on it, all the way down to my bones.

I am incredibly sorry to be apologizing so late to those who have given me love, but even though it is very late, I am writing this from my heart.

Regardless of the reason, because I am so deeply aware that my act of breaking the law cannot be justified by any words, I think it is only right for me to be criticized. I am truly sorry that, through my wrongdoings, I inflicted a deep wound on your hearts.

Because I feel like the love and memories that I was able to give all of you, and that you were able to give me, have been tarnished by my wrongdoings, I am full of regret, and I am so ashamed of my foolish self.

I am well aware of the meaning of the results of my latest trial. As much as I have caused harm to our society, and as much as I have disappointed those who believed in me, I promise you now through this letter that I will work that much harder to live an upright life and try not to hurt anyone ever again.

It was only after I caused many precious people to leave my side due to my wrongdoings that I realized far too late, but all too deeply, how I should live and how I need to change my attitude toward life.

Once again, I promise you through this letter that I will take care of myself and my surroundings so that I am able to always make the right choice in any given situation, and I will be especially careful not to make the same mistake again.

I sincerely thank the people who have been waiting for my personal statement for a long time. I will do my utmost to become a better person so that I never wound the people who were hurt by me ever again.

Once again, I am truly sorry.

Discography

Extended plays

Songs

As lead artist

Collaborations

As featured artist

Soundtrack appearances

Filmography

Television series

Variety shows

Music videos

Radio show

References

External links
  BTOB Official website 
 

1994 births
Living people
Cube Entertainment artists
South Korean male rappers
Rappers from Seoul
South Korean singer-songwriters
South Korean male television actors
South Korean male idols
Hanlim Multi Art School alumni
BtoB (band) members
Weekly Idol members
Male actors from Seoul
South Korean male singer-songwriters
South Korean hip hop record producers
South Korean people convicted of drug offenses